The Blériot-SPAD S.61 was a French fighter aircraft developed in 1923. Designed by André Herbemont, the S.61 was a conventional biplane, abandoning the swept upper wing used by Herbemont in several previous designs.  The prototype S.61 was evaluated by the French Air Force alongside the S.51 as a potential new fighter, but like its stablemate, was rejected. The Polish Air Force (which had also purchased the S.51) was impressed enough to order 250, as well as purchase licences for local production. The Romanian Air Force also ordered 100 aircraft. About 30 were built in Poland, by the CWL (Centralne Warszaty Lotnicze - Central Aviation Workshops, a predecessor of PZL).

Operational history
Apart from their military service, S.61s were used in France for racing and record-setting attempts. On 25 June 1925, Pelletier d'Oisy won the cross-country Coupe Michelin in an S.61, and another of the type won the 1927 competition and was placed second in 1929. An S.61 was also used by Jean Callizo in his fraudulent attempt on the world altitude record that saw him stripped of his Légion d'Honneur. A Polish S.61 placed second in the Capitaine Echard race at the Zürich aerial meeting in 1927.

The S.61 (known in Poland simply as Spad S.61) had a poor reputation in Poland due to numerous crashes, many attributed to a weak wing mounting. During the period from 1926 to 1931, 26 pilots were killed while flying the S.61.

Variants
S.61/1prototype for French evaluation, powered by a  Lorraine-Dietrich 12E W-12 engine with supplementary supercharger.

S.61/2production version for Poland and Romania, powered by a  Lorraine-Dietrich 12E W-12 engine with supplementary supercharger.

S.61bisconverted S.61/2, powered by a  Lorraine-Dietrich 12E W-12 engine with supplementary supercharger.

S.61/3single machine with reduced wingspan, powered by a  Lorraine-Dietrich 12E W-12 engine with supplementary supercharger.

S.61/4single machine with a  Lorraine-Dietrich 12Ee W-12 engine.

S.61/5three machines with a  Hispano-Suiza 12Gb W-12 engine.

S.61/6racer prototype converted from the S.61bis, powered by a  Lorraine-Dietrich 12E W-12 engine with supplementary supercharger.

S.61/6a:single racer

S.61/6b:The S.61/6a converted with extra fuel tankage for the 1924 Coupe Michelin race

S.61/6c:single aircraft built to contest world airspeed record; destroyed in the attempt

S.61/6d:single aircraft built for unsuccessful attempt on world airspeed record.

S.61/7Powered by a  Lorraine-Dietrich 12Eb W-12 engine, with Rateau supercharger for world altitude record attempt.

S.61/8A single S.61/5 refitted with a  Hispano-Suiza 12Hb V-12 engine.

S.61/9single S.61/6d modified for 1929 Coupe Michelin race, powered by a  Lorraine 7Ma Mizar radial engine.

S.61Ses (Ses for Sesquiplane) This was the final version of the Bleriot S.61, fitted with sesquiplane wings, powered by a  Lorraine-Dietrich 12Eb W-12 engine. (1 built).

Operators

Polish Air Force
 2nd Fighter Regiment
 3rd Fighter Regiment
 4th Fighter Regiment
 11th Fighter Regiment

Royal Romanian Air Force - 100 purchased

Soviet Air Force - One aircraft, used for tests and trials.

Specifications (S.61/2)

See also

References

Bibliography

Further reading
 
 
 

1920s French fighter aircraft
Blériot aircraft
Biplanes
Single-engined tractor aircraft
Racing aircraft
Aircraft first flown in 1923